Jhohan David Sanguino (born 1 December 1998) is a Venezuelan weightlifter. He won the silver medal in the men's 109kg event at the 2022 Pan American Weightlifting Championships held in Bogotá, Colombia. He won the gold medal in his event at the 2022 South American Games held in Asunción, Paraguay.

He also won two silver medals at the 2022 Bolivarian Games held in Valledupar, Colombia.

Achievements

References

External links 
 

Living people
1998 births
Venezuelan male weightlifters
Pan American Weightlifting Championships medalists
South American Games gold medalists for Venezuela
South American Games medalists in weightlifting
Competitors at the 2022 South American Games
21st-century Venezuelan people